Teemu Rinkinen (born March 7, 1987) is a Finnish former professional ice hockey forward. He played in Liiga for Pelicans, Blues, HPK and KooKoo before ending his career in DEL2 in Germany with Dresdner Eislöwen.

References

External links

1987 births
Living people
Dresdner Eislöwen players
Espoo Blues players
HPK players
KooKoo players
Lahti Pelicans players
Peliitat Heinola players
People from Hollola
Finnish ice hockey forwards
Sportspeople from Päijät-Häme